Bicycle counters are electronic devices that detect the number of bicycles passing by a location for a certain period of time. Some advanced counters can also detect the speed, direction, and type of bicycles. These systems are sometimes referred to as bicycle barometers, but the term is misleading because it indicates the measurement of pressure. Most counting stations only consist of sensors, the internal computing device, although some use a display to show the total number of cyclists of the day and the current year. There are counting stations all over the world in over hundreds of cities, for example in Manchester, Zagreb, or Portland. The first bicycle counting station was installed in Odense, Denmark, in 2002.

Persuasive aspects 
Bicycle counters are mainly being installed to assist city planning with reliable data on the development of bicycle usage. Bicycle counting stations are said to raise awareness for cycling as a mode of transportation, encourage more people to use their bicycles and give cyclists acknowledgement. There has been no representative study on the impact of bicycle counters on citizens or by-passers, but some early empirical clues that urban visualizations can "become appropriate communication media for sharing, discussing, and co-producing socially relevant data".

To increase visibility, bicycle counters are mostly installed at positions with high traffic volume and visibility to a range of road users.

They have been called urban visualizations and fulfill certain criteria of ambient intelligence, such as being embedded, context-aware and adaptive. Bicycle counting stations can be described as persuasive technology.

"Through sensing technology, a display can act as a tool that increases the capability to capture a behavior (e.g., measuring residential energy consumption, bicycle use, etc.); through its visual imagery, it can function as a medium that provides useful information, such as behavioral statistics or cause-and-effect relationships; and through its networking ability, it can become a social actor, encouraging community-based feedback and social interaction".

Technical setup 
Different techniques are used for detection of bicycles, such as built in induction loops, piezoelectric strips, pneumatic hoses, infrared sensing or cameras. Different setups provide different advantages such as more precise counting, battery life, reduced costs or differentiation between different road users such as cyclists, pedestrians or cars. Independent testing has shown that pneumatic tubes can record with over 95% accuracy and piezoelectric sensors reach 99% accuracy.  Manufacturers state a 90% precision for induction loops.

Data 
Unlike manual counting or other bicycle related interventions or citizen science, where citizens manually put in data, bicycle counting stations automatically generate citizen related data. Automatic counting systems are said to be cheaper than manual counting by people. Because of the use of communication technology in the urban context, bicycle counters can be counted as smart city technology, urban informatics or urban computing. Most of the organisations who install bicycle counters, provide the number of cyclists as open data.

Criticism 
There has been criticism on the precision of the counting and on the cost of bicycle counters as a waste of tax money (14000-31000€).

See also 
Different cities, such as Bonn or Lahti mentioned cyclists that are a round number of counting (like number 100.000).

Cycling barometer is also the name of a ranking by the European Cyclists' Federation for the most bicycle-friendly nations in the EU.

There has been creative use of the data generated by counting stations, such as an information-design poster which includes number of daily cyclists, precipitation and temperature.

References 

Cycling infrastructure
Road traffic management
Transportation planning
Road transport
Counting instruments